"Lucky Day" is a song by German singer Sasha. It was written and produced by Sasha along with Robin Grubert and Alexander Zuckowski for Sasha's first compilation album Greatest Hits (2006). Released as the album's second single, it reached the top 20 of the Austrian Singles Chart and the German Singles Chart.

Track listing

Charts

Weekly charts

Year-end charts

Lyrics

References

External links 
 

2007 singles
2006 songs
Sasha (German singer) songs
Warner Records singles